Ysgarth is a fantasy role-playing game written by Dave Nalle with contributions from other authors. It was originally released in 1979 by Ragnarok Games. The company also published subsequent editions of the game throughout the 1980s and 1990s, ending with the 6th edition in 1992. Various revisions and addenda are available on the internet, including partial versions of an unpublished 7th edition of the game. Ragnarok Games also published other board and roleplaying games, as well as a roleplaying magazine called Abyss Quarterly. Many of those involved in the development of Ysgarth were also subsequently involved in the development of the Quest for the Grail Arthurian CCG published by Stone Ring Games.

Description
The Ysgarth Rule System is a fantasy system, complex and detailed. In the first edition, Book 1, "The Fantasy Character", described character races (humans, elves, dwarves, insect-types, and reptilians), numerous characteristics, classes (fighters, mages, and holy men, and subclasses), skills, and character improvement. Book 2, "Battlecraft", describes the combat system; Book 3, "The Arcane Arts", covers the 15 schools of magic; Book 4, "Holy Orders", covers holy men, six religious orders, priestly magic, and 155 gods; Book 5, "The Fantasy World", covers world and campaign creation. "The Last Song of Hergest" is an introductory scenario.

Ysgarth is generally noted, both positively and negatively, for the extreme detail of its game mechanics. It was one of the first roleplaying systems to rely heavily on skills and discard the idea of character classes and also one of the first games to rely solely on the use of 10-sided dice for percentile rolls in resolving actions. Ysgarth also emphasizes realistic combat resolvable in minute detail. Some have praised the mechanics as innovative, and others have damned them as cumbersome. This issue of excessive mechanics is made more complex by the fact that each edition of Ysgarth featured fairly radical changes in the implementation of the basic rule concepts varying in their level of complexity. The 5th edition included three completely different versions of the mechanics in a single rulebook.

The game background is derived from Indo-European mythology overlaid on a unique cosmology involving an inter-planar diaspora and catastrophic warfare as the backdrop for the development of the world's current societies. The background material included in the 3rd and 4th editions of the rules is quite extensive and detailed as are materials included in some of the secondary worldbooks and adventure scenarios. The setting is highly magical with powerful deities and lesser supernatural beings playing significant roles in the development of the world and the lives of characters within it.

Publication history
Ysgarth was designed by David F. Nalle and published by Ragnarok Enterprises in 1979 as three digest-sized books (56 pages total). The second edition was published in 1980 as a 100-page digest-sized book. The third edition was published in 1982 as a digest-sized box with a red cover, including six books (120 pages total). The fourth edition (1982) was published in the same format as the third edition but with a blue cover. The fifth edition was published in 1985 as a digest-sized box, including three books: "RoleCraft" (36 pages), "SpellCraft" (24 pages), and "WorldCraft" (24 pages).

Many supplements and adventure modules were published over the course of about a dozen years when the game was particularly active, as well as games in other genres using mechanics derived from Ysgarth.

Reception
Lewis Pulsipher reviewed the second revised edition (orange cover) of Ysgarth Rules System in The Space Gamer No. 58. Pulsipher commented that "This is the closest I've seen to a simulation FRPG, and there's plenty of potential for additions to other systems, if you prefer [...] YRS is one of the FRP bargains of this or any year."

Rick Swan reviewed Ysgarth in Space Gamer/Fantasy Gamer No. 83. Swan commented that "As an integrated, self-contained fantasy system, Ysgarth more closely resembles Runequest than Dungeons and Dragons, but page for page is much tougher to digest than either one. It's a remarkable game, recommended for advanced players with dependable calculators and a lot of patience."

Reviews
White Wolf #45 (July, 1994)

References

External links
 Older Official website
 Author's Development Discussion Page
 Detailed Game Review on RPGnet

Fantasy role-playing games
Indie role-playing games
Role-playing games introduced in 1979